Series 26 of Top Gear, a British motoring magazine and factual television programme, was broadcast in the United Kingdom on BBC Two during 2019, consisting of five episodes between 17 February and 17 March. Although Sabine Schmitz would continue to make appearances as a guest star, Eddie Jordan discontinued his involvement following the previous series. This series' highlights included a journey across Sri Lanka in a Tuk-Tuk, presenters conducting challenges with second-hand luxury cars and a compilation of outtakes in the final episode. The twenty-sixth series attracted the lowest viewing figures in the programme's history, achieving an average of 2.35 million viewers during its broadcast.

Production
Production on the series began in 2017 with a trip to Norway and concluded in 2018.

Episodes

References

External links
 Series 26 at the Internet Movie Database

2019 British television seasons
Top Gear seasons